John Patrick Flesch (born July 15, 1953 in Sudbury, Ontario) is a Canadian former professional ice hockey left winger.  He was drafted by the Atlanta Flames in the fifth round, 69th overall, of the 1973 NHL Amateur Draft.  He played 124 National Hockey League games with the Minnesota North Stars, Pittsburgh Penguins, and Colorado Rockies.

He was also drafted by the World Hockey Association's Minnesota Fighting Saints; however, he never played in that league.

Career statistics

External links

1953 births
Atlanta Flames draft picks
Canadian ice hockey left wingers
Colorado Rockies (NHL) players
Columbus Owls players
Grand Rapids Owls players
Ice hockey people from Ontario
Sportspeople from Greater Sudbury
Kalamazoo Wings (1974–2000) players
Lake Superior State Lakers men's ice hockey players
Living people
Milwaukee Admirals (IHL) players
Minnesota Fighting Saints draft picks
Minnesota North Stars players
New Haven Nighthawks players
Omaha Knights (CHL) players
Pittsburgh Penguins players